The  is a constituency of the House of Councillors in the Diet of Japan. It consists of Nagasaki Prefecture and elects two Councillors, one every three years by a first-past-the-post system for a six-year term. In the first election in 1947, Nagasaki like all districts used single non-transferable vote to elect both its Councillors in one election.

The Councillors currently representing Nagasaki are:
 Yukishige Ōkubo (DPJ, Ozawa group; term ends in 2013) and
 Genjirō Kaneko (LDP; term ends in 2016), former Nagasaki governor and son of former representative and agriculture minister Iwazō Kaneko.

Single-member districts (ichinin-ku) for the House of Councillors often play a decisive role for the outcome of elections as little swing in votes is required to achieve a change of the Councillors elected there. Under the 1955 System Nagasaki voted consistently for conservative candidates until the landslide election of 1989 that led to a "twisted parliament" (nejire kokkai: opposition control of the House of Councillors). Following the party realignments of the 1990s when reformist conservative and liberal parties and ultimately the Democratic Party replaced the Socialists as the main opposition to the LDP, Nagasaki became a more closely contested potential swing district.

Elected Councillors 

#: resigned to contest the 1970 Nagasaki gubernatorial election; †: died in office

Election Results

References 
House of Councillors: Alphabetical list of former Councillors

Districts of the House of Councillors (Japan)